The Fiesole School of Music is a music school in Fiesole, Italy.  It was founded by Piero Farulli (it) in 1974.

It presents an annual New Year's Day concert at the Teatro del Maggio Musicale Fiorentino.

A premier institution at the Fiesole School of Music is the Orchestra Giovanile Italiana, the national youth orchestra of Italy.

 violinist Pavel Vernikov was tutor at the school, and Maria Kouznetsova one of his students.

References

External links
 

Music schools in Italy
1976 establishments in Italy
Fiesole